Dobrnja may refer to:
 Dobrnja, Banja Luka, Bosnia and Herzegovina
 Dobrnja, Tuzla, Bosnia and Herzegovina